The 2023 FIA Formula One World Championship is a motor racing championship for Formula One cars which is the 74th running of the Formula One World Championship. It is recognised by the Fédération Internationale de l'Automobile (FIA), the governing body of international motorsport, as the highest class of competition for open-wheel racing cars. The championship is contested over a record twenty-three , which will be held around the world, and began in March and will end in November.

Drivers and teams compete for the titles of World Drivers' Champion and World Constructors' Champion, respectively. Max Verstappen, driving for Red Bull Racing-Honda RBPT, is the reigning Drivers' Champion, while his team is the reigning Constructors' Champion.

Entries 
The following constructors and drivers are under contract to compete in the 2023 World Championship. All teams compete with tyres supplied by Pirelli. Each team is required to enter at least two drivers, one for each of the two mandatory cars.

Team changes 
Honda returned as a named engine supplier to Red Bull Racing and AlphaTauri, with both teams' engines badged as Honda RBPT. While Red Bull Powertrains had planned to take over assembly and maintenance of the engines from this season onwards, it was later agreed that Honda would continue its technical support of Red Bull Racing and AlphaTauri until the end of 2025.

Driver changes 

Sebastian Vettel retired at the end of the 2022 championship, ending his Formula One career after 16 seasons. His place at Aston Martin was taken by Fernando Alonso, who left Alpine after two seasons. His replacement was initially announced as the 2021 Formula 2 Champion and reserve driver Oscar Piastri. Shortly after the announcement, Piastri stated that he had not signed a contract for 2023 and that he would not be driving for Alpine. The FIA Contract Recognition Board ruled that he did not have any contractual obligations to race for Alpine. Pierre Gasly, who had a contract to drive for AlphaTauri, moved to Alpine, replacing Alonso. Gasly was replaced by the 2020–21 Formula E and 2019 Formula 2 Champion Nyck de Vries.

Daniel Ricciardo left McLaren after two seasons. Although he had a contract to drive for the team in 2023, it was terminated during the 2022 championship by mutual agreement. Ricciardo's seat was filled by Piastri, who made his Formula One debut. Nicholas Latifi left Williams after spending three seasons with the team. Mick Schumacher left Haas after two seasons.

Calendar 
The 2023 calendar contains twenty-three Grands Prix. The Azerbaijan, Austrian, Belgian, Qatar, United States and São Paulo Grands Prix will feature the sprint format.

Calendar expansion and changes 
The Grand Prix, along with the Saudi Arabian Grand Prix, was initially planned to be moved to a new purpose-built circuit, before both being retained in Lusail and Jeddah, respectively.
 The Las Vegas Grand Prix is due to make its debut, with the race planned to be held in November on a new street track across the Las Vegas Strip. The last Grand Prix held in Las Vegas was the 1982 Caesars Palace Grand Prix. Three races will be held in the United States in the same season for the first time since .
 The Russian Grand Prix was under contract to feature on the 2023 calendar. However, the Grand Prix had its contract terminated in response to the 2022 Russian invasion of Ukraine.
 The French Grand Prix will not feature on the 2023 calendar although the promoters of the Grand Prix stated that they would aim for a rotational race deal by sharing its slot with other Grands Prix.
It was not replaced.

Regulation changes

Technical regulations

Reducing porpoising
Following large amounts of porpoising during , the FIA introduced changes to the regulations to limit excessive porpoising. The diffuser edge stiffness was increased and an additional sensor was mandated to monitor the porpoising phenomenon more effectively. Lateral floor deflection tests also became more stringent.

Changes to roll hoop design regulations
Following Zhou Guanyu's crash at the 2022 British Grand Prix, a rounded top is now required on the roll hoop, which reduces the chance of it digging into the ground during an accident; a change was made to ensure a minimum height for the point of application of the homologation test; a new physical homologation test was introduced where the load pushes the roll hoop in the forward direction; new tests were defined to be carried out by calculation.

Mirror size

Weight and fuel temperature
However, this initially planned change was later abandoned mainly due to the introduction of heavier Pirelli tyres.

Slot gap separators on front wing
The FIA initially altered the wording of the aerodynamic regulations after Mercedes produced a front wing which exploited a potential loop-hole in the regulations. Mercedes introduced slot gap separators on their front wings at the 2022 United States Grand Prix, although they did not intend to run them at the event. Rival teams argued that the new front wing was illegal. Mercedes argued that the regulations allowed slot-gap separators as they were "primarily" there for "mechanical, structural or measurement reasons", and therefore any secondary aerodynamic benefit would be allowed. The FIA ruled that the brackets were illegal at the following 2022 Mexico City Grand Prix. The wording of the regulation was altered so that the slot gap separator brackets must perform a structural role, and the sentence explaining that the primary purpose can not be aerodynamic has been removed. This rule change was intended to outlaw slot gap separators. However, this rule change had the opposite effect, as it means that slot gap separators are legal if they provide structural support, how much aerodynamic benefit they provide no longer has any bearing on their legality. Ferrari launched their car, the SF-23 with the slot gap separators.

Sporting regulations
With the intention of making tyre usage more sustainable in the future, Formula One will trial a reduction in allocated tyre sets from 13 to 11 at two races in 2023. At these races the use of tyres in qualifying will be mandated as hard in Q1, medium in Q2 and soft in Q3, assuming that the weather is dry. Teams are usually free to choose which tyre compound they run during qualifying.

Pirelli announced a change to the available tyre compounds for 2023, as a new compound was inserted between the old C1 and C2 compounds. This change provides teams with more flexible strategy options after criticism towards the original C1 compound for a large drop in grip compared to the other tyres. Additionally, following criticism over the raceability of its full wet tyre in previous seasons, Pirelli has produced a new full wet tyre in the hope of reducing the need for safety car and red flags in wet race conditions. This new full wet tyre is scheduled to be in service from the Emilia Romagna Grand Prix onwards. The sport will also aim to trial wet weather-specific bodywork designed to improve visibility and reduce spray during 2023 with the aim of fully introducing it by the start of the 2024 championship at latest.

There were only three days of pre-season testing, a reduction from 2022 when there were six days. During the F1 Commission held in February 2023 it was decided to relax the restrictions on team radio communications.

Sprint events  
During Sprint weekends, teams will be given greater scope with which parts they are permitted to change under parc fermé conditions.

Points awarded for shortened races 
The 2022 sporting regulations only specified that races ended early by a red flag used a points system that gradually increased points awarded based on the completed race distance. This caused confusion at the 2022 Japanese Grand Prix, where full points were awarded despite less than 75% of the scheduled distance being completed, as the race ended under green flag conditions. The wording of the regulation has now been amended: all races where less than 75% of the race distance is completed now use the sliding scale system to determine the points being given, regardless of whether they finish under red or green flag conditions. This rule change satisfied the original intention of the gradual scale points system when it was introduced in 2022.

Enactment of political gestures 
The FIA's International Sporting Code (ISC) was updated to include stricter controls on drivers and teams making "political, religious and personal statements". Article 12.2.1n was introduced stating that drivers and teams must receive the FIA's permission before conducting a political statement or protest and that any protest without permission would be considered a breach of the FIA's neutrality rules. The FIA stated the update to the ISC was done to move it in line with the ethical principles of political neutrality laid out by the International Olympic Committee, which gave formal recognition to the FIA in 2013 through the Olympic Charter. FIA President Mohammed Ben Sulayem stated that the rule change was made to ensure that the FIA's platform was not used to help fulfil drivers' "private personal agenda".

Following concerns from drivers and teams on how these rules would affect freedom of expression and the ability of drivers and their teams to express views about what they believe to be a worthwhile cause, the FIA clarified in February 2023 that drivers would be prohibited on making political or religious statement on the following: politically sensitive persons living or dead, military or political conflicts, separatist movements, national governments, any statements referencing a key religious figure or any statement that could be deemed offensive to the religious beliefs of the hosting country. Stewards at each Grand Prix meeting will be required to adjudge whether a driver has breached FIA neutrality rules on a case-by-case basis. Drivers remain free to share their opinions regarding political or religious topics without facing potential sanctions on their personal social media platforms, in an official FIA press conference providing it is in response to a media question or outside of a race weekend. Any driver looking for a special exemption to from the FIA to make a statement that may contravene the neutrality rules must notify the FIA four weeks in advance of an event.

Relaxation of COVID-19 protocols 
This relaxation of restrictions included the removal of the need for proof of vaccination for those working in the paddock.

Financial regulations 
Teams have also agreed to give the FIA easier access to factories when cost cap audits are being carried out in order to more easily ensure that teams adhere to the cost cap. A winter shutdown of factories was introduced alongside the existing summer shutdown.

Season summary

Pre-season 
There was one pre-season test, at the Bahrain International Circuit in Sakhir on 23–25 February. Aston Martin driver Lance Stroll missed the test after suffering a "minor" cycling accident during training. He was replaced by reserve driver Felipe Drugovich.

Opening rounds 
Red Bull Racing locked out the front row for the season opening Bahrain Grand Prix, with the two Ferrari's on the second row. The much-improved Aston Martin of Fernando Alonso started in fifth. Max Verstappen led nearly all the race comfortably, winning by eleven seconds ahead of his teammate Sergio Pérez. Charles Leclerc retired with a mechanical failure from third, with Fernando Alonso taking this spot, after a late race overtake on Carlos Sainz. Lewis Hamilton finished fifth. Lance Stroll, still racing with a broken wrist and toe, finished sixth, ahead of the Mercedes of George Russell. 

In the Saudi Arabia Grand Prix, Sergio Pérez took pole position in qualifying. Pérez dropped to second position in the first lap to Fernando Alonso, but regained first on lap four. Verstappen, starting fifteenth on the grid, reached second by lap 25, and remained there for the rest of the race. Verstappen also recorded the fastest lap. Fernando Alsono rounded out the podium finishing third, with the Mercedes duo of George Russell and Lewis Hamilton finishing in fourth and fifth respectively.

Results and standings

Grands Prix

Scoring system 

Points are awarded to the top ten classified drivers, the driver who sets the fastest lap during the Grand Prix (only if one of the top ten), and the top eight of the sprint. In the case of a tie on points, a countback system is used where the driver with the most Grand Prix wins is ranked higher. If the number of wins is identical, then the number of second places is considered, and so on. The points are awarded for every race using the following system:

World Drivers' Championship standings

World Constructors' Championship standings

Notes

References

External links 

 
Formula One
Formula One seasons
Formula One